Written By is a 2009 Hong Kong fantasy drama film co-written, produced, and directed by Wai Ka-Fai, and starring Lau Ching-Wan and Kelly Lin.  Lau plays a lawyer who is killed in an accident, leaving behind his wife, daughter, and son.  He is resurrected as a character in his daughter's novel, where he finds himself a grieving husband who lost his family and his sight during a car accident, living in an alternate reality.  The film premiered at the New York Asian Film Festival in June 2009, and was released theatrically in Hong Kong on 10 July 2009.

Plot
"Lau Ching-Wan plays a lawyer who dies in a car wreck just before answering his daughters question about ghosts, leaving behind his wife, daughter and son. To console herself, his daughter (blind from the crash) writes a novel where she, her mother and brother have died in a car wreck but her father(but blind) has survived. To her surprise, the character of her father in her book decides that HE needs to write a novel to console himself and in his novel he has died but his wife and daughter have lived...and on and on in an endlessly recursive loop, as wounded characters desperately apply fiction to try and dull the sharp edges of their grief."

Cast
 Lau Ching-Wan as Tony 
 Kelly Lin as Mandy 
 Mia Yam as Melody 
 Yeung Shuk Man as Maid  
 Bonnie Wong as a Ghost Whisperer 
 Jo Kuk as Meng Por

Production
To prepare for his role as a blind man, Lau Ching-Wan studied braille, a method that is widely used by blind people to read and write. He joked that now with his eyes open he did not understand a single word in braille, but when he closed his eyes to touch it he could read it smoothly. Even after filming, Lau still felt attached to his character, and often engaged in mood swings.

Release
Written By made its world premiere as an "Opening film" at the New York Asian Film Festival in June 2009. The film was later released theatrically in Hong Kong on 10 July 2009. Director Wai Ka-Fai attended the premiere.  Lau Ching-Wan was originally set appear at the festival, but decided to stay in Hong Kong due to the 2009 flu pandemic.

Awards and nominations
16th Hong Kong Film Critics Society Award
 Won: Best Screenplay (Wai Ka Fai and Au Kin Yee)
 Film of Merit

4th Asian Film Awards
 Nominated: Best Screenwriter (Wai Ka Fai and Au Kin Yee)

29th Hong Kong Film Awards
 Nominated: Best Screenplay (Wai Ka Fai and Au Kin Yee)
 Nominated: Best Visual Effects (Teddy Mak Tak Man, Ken Law Wai Ho and Mary Ng Sze Sze)

References

External links
 

2009 films
China Star Entertainment Group films
2000s fantasy drama films
Hong Kong fantasy drama films
Films directed by Wai Ka-Fai
Films with screenplays by Wai Ka-fai
2009 drama films
2000s Hong Kong films
2000s Cantonese-language films